Fitjanuten is a mountain in southern Norway.

References

Mountains of Vestfold og Telemark
Mountains of Rogaland
Suldal
Vinje